Arthur Levitt Sr. (June 28, 1900 – May 6, 1980) was an American lawyer and politician who served as the 50th New York State Comptroller.

Early life
Levitt was born in Brooklyn in 1900. He served in the U.S. Army in World War I and World War II, finishing the latter as a colonel. After leaving the military, he earned degrees from Columbia University and Columbia Law School. While attending Columbia College, Levitt was initiated into the Alpha Chapter of Phi Sigma Delta which later merged into Zeta Beta Tau Fraternity.

Career 
Levitt served on the New York State Board of Education from 1952 to 1954.

Levitt was New York State comptroller from 1955 to 1978, elected on the Democratic and Liberal tickets in 1954, 1958, 1962, 1966, 1970 and 1974, the longest-serving person in this office. He was a delegate to the 1956, 1960 and 1964 Democratic National Conventions.

In 1961, he was the Tammany Hall regular candidate for the Democratic nomination for mayor of New York City, but was defeated in the primary by incumbent Mayor Robert F. Wagner Jr. who had broken with Tammany's leader, Carmine DeSapio.

Levitt was granted an honorary degree from Hamilton College in 1979. The Arthur Levitt Public Policy Center on the Hamilton College is named in his honor.

Personal life 
His son, Arthur Levitt Jr., was chairman of the United States Securities and Exchange Commission from 1993 to 2001.

References

Obit in Time magazine on May 19, 1980
Political Graveyard

1900 births
1980 deaths
Jewish American military personnel
United States Army personnel of World War I
United States Army personnel of World War II
New York State Comptrollers
New York (state) Democrats
Jewish American people in New York (state) politics
Politicians from Brooklyn
United States Army colonels
20th-century American politicians
20th-century American Jews